Kyle Henry Erovre Okposo (born April 16, 1988) is an American professional ice hockey right winger and captain of the Buffalo Sabres of the National Hockey League (NHL). He was drafted seventh overall in the 2006 NHL Entry Draft by the New York Islanders, for whom he played from 2008 to 2016.

Playing career

Junior and college
Okposo played one season in the United States Hockey League (USHL) with the Des Moines Buccaneers in which he was named the most valuable player of the USHL playoffs and the league's top rookie. He helped the Buccaneers to a Clark Cup victory.

During his freshman season at University of Minnesota, Okposo was placed at the center position, even though he is a natural winger. Throughout most of the season this became his most common position due to the abundance of wingers on the team.
In January 2007, he played for the U.S. National Junior Team in the 2007 IIHF World Junior Championship. On June 7, 2007, Okposo announced he would be returning to the University of Minnesota for the 2007–08 season. Okposo played the 2007–08 season for the University of Minnesota ice hockey team until December 19, 2007. On that morning Okposo notified his teammates at the university of his decision to leave the team. Soon after, both the Gophers and the New York Islanders announced officially that Okposo decided to leave college after the completion of his current semester and would then begin his professional hockey career.

Okposo's decision to leave school was considered controversial by some. As a response to questioning, Islanders general manager Garth Snow told the Minneapolis Star-Tribune, "Quite frankly, we weren't happy with the program. They have a responsibility to coach, to make Kyle a better player, and they were not doing that."

Coach Don Lucia then claimed that the Islanders put him "in a very difficult position." In his response to Snow's comments, Lucia emphasized the importance of obtaining a degree, "We have had numerous players sign and play in the NHL, but just as important many more move on to have successful careers after graduating from the University of Minnesota. We have always and will continue to work to ensure our players reach their potential on the ice and in the classroom."

New York Islanders

Okposo signed an entry-level contract with the Islanders and was assigned to their top minor league affiliate, the AHL's Bridgeport Sound Tigers. He made his NHL debut on March 18, 2008, against the Toronto Maple Leafs, and netted his first career NHL goal on March 21, 2008, against the New Jersey Devils, a game-winner scored on the powerplay against Martin Brodeur. He also scored in his final game of the season in a game against the New York Rangers.

On September 17, 2009, Okposo suffered a mild concussion after a check to the head by Dion Phaneuf. He returned to the Islanders' lineup for their opening game on October 3, 2009. On May 25, 2011, he signed a five-year, $14 million contract with the New York Islanders.

Okposo broke out in the 2013–14 season, shortly after a strong 2013 playoffs against the Pittsburgh Penguins. Playing on a line mostly with John Tavares and Thomas Vanek, Okposo scored 69 points in 71 games, leading the Islanders in points for the first and only time since he and Tavares were on the team together (Mathew Barzal also led the Islanders in scoring with Tavares on the roster, but not Okposo). He scored his 100th career goal on October 14, 2014 against the New York Rangers. On January 16, 2015, Okposo scored four goals against the Penguins, also being his first NHL hat trick.

Buffalo Sabres
On July 1, 2016, Okposo signed a seven-year, $42 million contract with the Buffalo Sabres.

During his first season with the club, Okposo recorded 45 points in 65 games. He also represented the team at the 2017 National Hockey League All-Star Game. He missed time at the end of the season after suffering a concussion and having a reaction to the medication.

Okoposo's output declined in each of the next four seasons and fans eventually began to call for him to be bought out of his contract. However, he posted a strong bounce back in the 2021–22 season, scoring 21 goals and 24 assists for 45 points, his highest total since his first season with the Sabres.

After spending the previous season as an alternate, Okposo was named the 20th captain in Sabres history ahead of the 2022–23 season.

Personal life
Okposo's Nigerian father, Kome Okposo, and American mother, Michelle Okposo, are both pharmacists.

Okposo married his wife, Danielle, on July 28, 2012. Their first child was born on January 6, 2014. Their second was born in April 2016.

In late March 2017, Okposo was hospitalized in the neurosurgical intensive care unit in Buffalo General Hospital and missed the remainder of the season.

Career statistics

Regular season and playoffs

International

Awards and honors

References

External links

1988 births
Living people
African-American ice hockey players
American men's ice hockey right wingers
American sportspeople of Nigerian descent
Bridgeport Sound Tigers players
Buffalo Sabres players
Des Moines Buccaneers players
Ice hockey people from Saint Paul, Minnesota
Minnesota Golden Gophers men's ice hockey players
National Hockey League first-round draft picks
New York Islanders draft picks
New York Islanders players
National Hockey League All-Stars
21st-century African-American sportspeople
20th-century African-American people